Valashan (also Romanized as Vālāshān) is a village in Hemmatabad Rural District, in the Central District of Borujerd County, Lorestan Province, Iran. At the 2006 census, its population was 354, in 93 families.

References 

Populated places in Borujerd County